Ishwar Chaudhary (born 10 July 1988) is an Indian cricketer. He made his first-class debut for Gujarat in the 2008–09 Ranji Trophy on 23 November 2008. Ahead of the 2018–19 Ranji Trophy, he transferred from Gujarat to Sikkim. He was the leading wicket-taker for Sikkim in the tournament, with 51 dismissals in eight matches.

References

External links
 

1988 births
Living people
Indian cricketers
Gujarat cricketers
Sikkim cricketers
Place of birth missing (living people)